The 1979 Little All-America college football team is composed of college football players from small colleges and universities who were selected by the Associated Press (AP) as the best players at each position.

First team

Offense
 Tight end - Paul Muckenhirn, North Dakota
 Wide receiver - Jerry Young, Wisconsin-Whitewater
 Offensive tackles -  Dave Melone, Lehigh;; Jeff Lear, Youngstown
 Offensive guards - Herb Beck, Delaware; Tyrone McGriff, Florida A&M
 Center - Jim Leonard, Santa Clara
 Quarterback - Joe Aliotti, Boise State
 Running backs - Chris "Poke" Cobb, Eastern Illinois; Frank Hawkins, Nevada-Reno; Mal Najarian, Boston University

Defense
 Defensive ends - Plummmer Bullock, Virginia Union; Pete Catan, Eastern Illinois
 Defensive tackles - Joe Gordon, Grambling; Doug Scott, Boise
 Middle guard - Ernie Englan, St. John's (MN)
 Linebackers - Andy Hawkins, Texas A&I; Ed Judie, Northern Arizona; Ezekiel Vaughn, Ouachita Baptist
 Defensive backs - Mike Ellis, Norfolk State; Terry Love, Murray State; Jack Quinn, Springfield

See also
 1979 College Football All-America Team

References

Little All-America college football team
Little All-America college football team
Little All-America college football team
Little All-America college football teams